The Kingston Arts Council (KAC) is the oldest municipal arts council in Ontario, serving the Kingston, Ontario and surrounding region. The KAC administers City of Kingston Arts Fund grants and Nan Yeomans Grant for Artistic Development, advocates on behalf of local artists, produces an annual Arts Guide, and organizes an annual Juried Art Salon in addition to numerous other community arts events and workshops.

History

The Kingston Arts Council was founded in 1961 in response to plans to demolish The Grand Theatre (then known as the Grand Opera House). A group of concerned citizens advocated that the theatre instead become a civic theatre, which was a success (the Grand Theatre reopened in 1964). The Kingston Arts Council adopted its constitution in 1962 and incorporated in 1963. The KAC has since grown to a major arts advocacy, funding and promotion resource in Kingston and the area. It receives operating funds from the Ontario Arts Council. 

The Kingston Arts Council made national headlines when artist Margaret Sutherland entered the piece "Emperor Haute Couture" in the 2012 Juried Art Salon. This piece portrayed Canadian Prime Minister Stephen Harper in the nude and created controversy due to its subject and its display in the Kingston Frontenac Public Library.

References

External links
Official Website of The Grand Theatre
Kingston Arts Council

Culture of Kingston, Ontario
Arts councils of Canada
Arts organizations established in 1961
Organizations based in Kingston, Ontario
1961 establishments in Ontario